Hikida's short-legged skink (Brachymeles apus) is a species of skink endemic to Malaysia.

References

Reptiles of Malaysia
Reptiles described in 1982
Brachymeles